Head for Points is a British travel website covering discussion of airline frequent-flyer programs and hotel loyalty programs in the UK. It has been referenced by National Geographic, CNN and the BBC. The site has a predominantly UK-based readership, and served up 2,429,000 page views to 591,000 unique visitors in August 2022.

The website typically publishes three new articles per day, with about half of the posts focussed on British Airways and Avios points.

See also 
 FlyerTalk

External links 
 Head for Points

References

Aviation Internet forums
British travel websites